The Cupatitzio River is a river of Michoacán state in Southwestern Mexico.

Course
Its main headwaters are in Barranca del Cupatitzio National Park, in Uruapan, Michoacán. Near its source are two waterfalls, the larger Tzararacua and the smaller Tzararacuita (little Tzararacua).

After flowing some distance in the highlands ("Altiplano") of western-central Michoacan state, the river takes a course mainly towards the south.

It drains into the Balsas River which, in turn, empties into the Pacific Ocean.

See also
List of rivers of Mexico

References
Utexas.edu: Atlas of Mexico — Map of the rivers and river basins of Mexico (1975).
The Prentice Hall American World Atlas, 1984.
Rand McNally, The New International Atlas, 1993.

Balsas River
Rivers of Michoacán